Brigadier-General Guy Livingston,  (17 July 1881 – 10 May 1950) was a British Army and Royal Air Force officer of the early 20th century.  He was one of the small number of Royal Flying Corps generals in latter stages of the First World War, serving as the Chief Staff Officer at the RFC's Training Division and then as Director of Air Organisation.  With the creation of the RAF on 1 April 1918, Livingston was appointed Deputy Master-General of Personnel at the Air Ministry. He remained in this post until late November 1918 when Brigadier-General Francis Festing took over.

Livingston's autobiography, Hot Air in Cold Blood, was published by Selwyn & Blount in 1933.

References

External links
Brigadier-General G Livingston – Air of Authority – A History of RAF Organisation

|-

|-

1881 births
1950 deaths
British Army personnel of the Second Boer War
British Army generals of World War I
Companions of the Order of St Michael and St George
Royal Flying Corps officers
Royal Air Force generals of World War I
London Regiment officers
Royal Fusiliers officers